Henry Irving Bartling (June 27, 1914 – June 12, 1973) was an American Major League Baseball infielder. He played for the Philadelphia Athletics during the  season. Bartling attended Michigan State University.

References

Major League Baseball infielders
Philadelphia Athletics players
Baseball players from Michigan
Abbeville A's players
Henderson Oilers players
Williamsport Grays players
Baltimore Orioles (IL) players
Wilkes-Barre Barons (baseball) players
Hartford Bees players
1914 births
1973 deaths